Francis Gerald Sullivan (July 26, 1898 in Toronto, Ontario – January 8, 1989) was a Canadian ice hockey player who competed in the 1928 Winter Olympics.

In 1928 he was a member of the University of Toronto Grads, the Canadian team which won the gold medal. His brother, Joe, was also on the team.

His son, Peter, played in the NHL with the Winnipeg Jets.

External links
Frank Sullivan's profile at databaseOlympics

1898 births
1989 deaths
Ice hockey people from Toronto
Players of Canadian football from Ontario
Toronto Argonauts players
Canadian ice hockey players
Ice hockey players at the 1928 Winter Olympics
Medalists at the 1928 Winter Olympics
Olympic gold medalists for Canada
Olympic ice hockey players of Canada
Olympic medalists in ice hockey
Toronto Varsity Blues ice hockey players